The Heart Has Its Reasons may refer to:

 The Heart Has Its Reasons (memoir), a 1956 memoir by Wallis, Duchess of Windsor
 "The Heart Has Its Reasons" (song), a song from Roger Daltrey's 1987 album Can't Wait to See the Movie
 "The Heart Has Its Reasons" (2point4 children), an episode of 2point4 Children
 The Heart Has Its Reasons, translation of Dil-o-Danish by Krishna Sobti